Jules de Rohan  is the name of:

 Jules, Prince of Soubise (1697–1724), son of Hercule Mériadec, Duke of Rohan-Rohan and Anne Geneviève de Lévis
 Jules, Prince of Guéméné (1726–1800), son of Hercule Mériadec, Prince of Guéméné and Louise de Rohan